Pottsia is a genus of plants in the family Apocynaceae, first described as a genus in 1837. It is native to East and Southeast Asia.

Species
 Pottsia densiflora D.J.Middleton - Laos, Thailand
 Pottsia grandiflora Markgr. - Fujian, Guangdong, Guangxi, Hunan, Yunnan, Zhejiang
 Pottsia laxiflora (Blume) Kuntze - Fujian, Guangdong, Guangxi, Guizhou, Hainan, Hunan, Yunnan, Zhejiang, Assam, Bangladesh, Indochina, W Malaysia, Sumatra, Java, Bali

References

Apocynaceae genera
Apocyneae